DYRU (92.9 FM), broadcasting as Barangay RU 92.9 Super Radyo, is a radio station owned and operated by GMA Network Inc. The station's studio and transmitter are located at Torres-Oliva Bldg., Roxas Ave. Ext., Brgy. Andagao, Kalibo. At present, Barangay RU is considered one of the top stations in the province.

History
The station began its operations in 1995 as Campus Radio with a mass-based format. On March 8, 1997, it rebranded as Bisig Bayan and switched to a news and talk format. Among its notable programs are Ieitsahan, Pasipeat and Parke de Libertad. On 1999, it rebranded as Super Radyo following the update of GMA's logo. On February 17, 2014, as part of the brand unification among RGMA's FM stations, the station rebranded as Barangay 92.9 Super Radyo and added music to its programming. It also simulcast DZBB shows like Balitang Balita, Super Balita, etc. It also simulcasted GMA Regional TV One Western Visayas and 24 Oras even others on Super Radyo and Barangay FM as of 2023.

Notable anchors (Super Radyo)
Jan Allen Ascaño
Butz Maquinto
Lyneth Mendoza
Ava Marie Moises

Notable DJs (Barangay FM)

Mama Ly
Mama Real
Mama Bebang
Papa Lando

References

Radio stations in Aklan
Barangay FM stations
Radio stations established in 1997